Live at Gilley's! is a live album by Jimmy Sturr and His Orchestra, released through Ranwood Records in 1991. In 1992, the album won Sturr the Grammy Award for Best Polka Album.

Track listing

Personnel

 Gene Bartkiewicz – accordion
 Skip Bierstien – bass
 Dennis Coyman – drums
 Kent Crawford – art direction
 Johnny Karas – tenor saxophone, vocals
 Joe Magnuszewski – arranger, clarinet, alto saxophone
 Al Noble – trumpet
 Jim Osborn – trumpet

 Eric Parks – trumpet
 Tom Pick – engineer, mixing
 Jimmy Sturr – arranger, clarinet, producer, alto saxophone
 Jimmy Sturr and His Orchestra – performer
 Frank Urbanovitch – fiddle
 Ken Uy – piano
 Henry Will – arranger

See also
 Polka in the United States

References

1991 live albums
Grammy Award for Best Polka Album
Jimmy Sturr albums